Ridge Racer 3 may refer to:

Rave Racer, the third arcade game in the Ridge Racer series
Rage Racer, the third console game in the Ridge Racer series